Susan Mary Watson is a New Zealand law academic specialising in company law. She is currently a full professor at the University of Auckland.

Academic career

After an undergraduate at the University of Auckland, she practiced for two city law firms before joining the staff, rising to full professor.

Watson occasionally writes for the New Zealand Herald

Selected works 
 Watson, Susan, and Rebecca Hirsch. "The link between corporate governance and corruption in New Zealand." (2010).
 Vasudev, Palladam Madhavrao, and Susan Watson, eds. Corporate governance after the financial crisis. Edward Elgar Publishing, 2012.
 Farrar, John H., and Susan Watson. "Self-Dealing, Fair Dealing and Related Party Transactions—History, Policy and Reform." Journal of Corporate Law Studies 11, no. 2 (2011): 495–523.
 Watson, Susan. "The significance of the source of the powers of boards of directors in UK company law." (2010).
 Watson, Susan. "Liability of auditors to third parties in New Zealand, clarification at last." Journal of Business Law (2001): 52-52.

References

External links
  
 

Living people
New Zealand women academics
New Zealand women lawyers
University of Auckland alumni
Academic staff of the University of Auckland
Year of birth missing (living people)
20th-century New Zealand lawyers